Dacryoscyphus is a genus of anamorphic fungi in the Dacrymycetales order. The genus is monotypic, containing the single species Dacryoscyphus chrysochilus, found in China. The genus and species were formally described in 2005.

References

External links
 

Dacrymycetes
Fungi of Asia
Monotypic Basidiomycota genera